The Ivorian national under-23 football team represents Ivory Coast in international under-23 tournaments.
 
Nicknamed Les Petit Éléphants (The Small Elephants" in English), the under-23 national team's first appearance on the world stage was in 2003 at the 2003 FIFA World Youth Championship; they reached Round of 16 before being ousted by the United States.

Results and fixtures

Legend

2021

Players

Current squad
 The following players were called up for the 2023 Africa U-23 Cup of Nations qualification matches.
 Match dates: 22 and 29 October 2022
 Opposition: Caps and goals correct as of:''' 21 October 2022

Recent call-ups

Honours
2010 Toulon Tournament (first title)

Competitive record

2010 Toulon Tournament
The Toulon Tournament (officially the Tournoi Espoirs de Toulon or "Toulon Hopefuls' Tournament")is a football tournament which traditionally features invited national teams composed of under-21 players.

This was only Ivory Coast's 2nd appearance and they still performed well. The results are below.

Group stage group A

All times local (CEST)

Semifinals

Final

2008 Summer Olympics
Ivory Coast- qualified for the 2008 Olympics. This African team representing Africa at the 2006 FIFA World Championships in Germany. It is one of the best teams in Africa. "We are one of the few African countries to have an organized youth league. Great players have always come out of the Ivory Coast; I'm thinking of Laurent Pokou in the 1970s; and Youssou Fofana in the 1980s. But now the footballing infrastructure is much better and so many youngsters are getting the right coaching", said Henri Michel (former coach of the Côte d'Ivoire national soccer team). Ivory Coast won the African Cup of Nations in 1992.
Ivory Coast went far in the 2008 Olympics but stumbled at the last hurdle by losing to Nigeria 2-0 in quarter finals.

Group stage group A

Quarterfinals

See also
Sport in Ivory Coast
Football in Ivory Coast
Women's football in Ivory Coast
Ivory Coast national football team
Ivory Coast national under-20 football team
Ivory Coast national under-17 football team
Ivory Coast women's national football team

References

African national under-23 association football teams
under-23